À la recherche de la nouvelle star  (Looking for the new Star) is a reality television show based on the popular British show Pop Idol. The show is a contest to determine the best young singer in La Francophonie. It was hosted by Benjamin Castaldi. The Belgian singer Jonatan Cerrada won over Thierry Amiel with 50.4% of the total votes, and went on to represent France at the 2004 Eurovision Song Contest, with "À chaque pas".

After the first season the show was renamed Nouvelle Star.

Auditions
The inaugural season of À la Recherche de la Nouvelle Star had seven audition cities to find the best talent not only in France, but also Belgium and Canada:
 Toulouse (8 February)
 Lyon (14 February)
 Marseille (18 February)
 Rennes (22 February)
 Paris (28 February)
 Brussels, Belgium (7 March)
 Montreal, Canada (14 March)

Finals

Finalists
(ages stated at time of contest)

Live Show Details

Heat 1 (24 April 2003)

Heat 2 (1 May 2003)

Heat 3 (8 May 2003)

Live Show 1 (15 May 2003)
Theme: Contestant's Choice

Live Show 2 (22 May 2003)
Theme: My Birth Year

Live Show 3 (29 May 2003)
Theme: Film Hits

Live Show 4 (5 June 2003)
Theme: Pop Hits

Live Show 5 (12 June 2003)
Theme: Funky Hits

Live Show 6 (19 June 2003)
Theme: Années 2000

Live Show 7 (26 June 2003)
Theme: Le Voyage

Live Show 8: Semi-final (3 July 2003)
Theme: Hommage

Live final (10 July 2003)

External links
Official Site (French)
Unofficial site

Nouvelle Star
Television series by Fremantle (company)
2003 French television series debuts
2003 French television seasons